Skataas Lake is a lake in Kandiyohi County, in the U.S. state of Minnesota.

Skataas Lake bears the name of an early settler.

See also
List of lakes in Minnesota

References

Lakes of Minnesota
Lakes of Kandiyohi County, Minnesota